Collados is a hamlet located in the municipality of Sotorribas, in Cuenca province, Castilla–La Mancha, Spain. As of 2021, it has a population of 29.

Geography 
Collados is located 22km north of Cuenca, Spain.

References

Populated places in the Province of Cuenca